The following is a table of all songs recorded by The Bee Gees from 1967 to 2001. Songs recorded in Australia and covers of Beatles songs are not included.

 The columns labeled "title," "year," and "album" list each song title, the year in which the song was recorded, and the official studio album or compilation album on which a Bee Gees' version of the song first appeared.
 The "songwriter(s)" column lists the writer(s) of each song.

Table 

Bee Gees